The Amstrad E-mailer (often stylized as E-m@iler or written as Emailer or Em@iler) is a Personal Communication Centre that is a landline phone device, launched in March 2000.

History

Design and release
The idea for the Amstrad E-mailer was conceived by Bob Watkins and was called BSI, the product was designed by Cliff Lawson and Ian Saward who started working on the Emailer in 1997. It was based on the Amstrad PB1500 Landline phone, using the same design and layout.

The first Amstrad E-mailer was a collaboration between Amstrad and BT, with Amstrad using the backend and email server provided by BT. BT released their own e-mail phone, the BT Easicom 1000, in 1998, 2 years before the Emailer's release. When the Amstrad E-mailer was released in March 2000, it had the "Powered by BT" logo printed on it. By 2002 Amstrad hosted their own Email/Internet service and broke all ties with BT.

The bootloader was named "PBL", an abbreviation for "Primary Boot Loader", and was designed by Trevor Kellaway at Application Solutions for Amstrad.

The E-mailer was a desktop telephone with a 4:3 5.8" LCD screen and limited Internet dialup and email messaging capabilities. Later models (the E-m@iler Plus, released 2002, and E3 Superphone with video Phone capabilities, released 2004) included the ability to play ZX Spectrum Computer Games.

Profitability
Amstrad made a loss on every E-Mailer sold. Amstrad recouped that loss through the phone calls made each day with a "pay-as-you-use" business model. It was only after they were used for 2 to 3 years that they finally paid their build cost back to Amstrad and started to make a profit. Amstrad eventually broke even, as Lord Sugar said in an interview in 2011:

I think the mistake was that it was slightly too late – we’re going back maybe ten years or more. The explosion of the broadband market meant the demise of that product. We sold 450,000 but we subsidised them because I wanted to get into a business where I was no longer on the treadmill of expecting to make a profit on hardware. There was a cost each time a person sent an email and that was where our revenues were coming from. But they are still out there – I think there are 150,000 people still using them and I think someone told me Amstrad now has broken even and we have actually recovered all the costs.

The unpopularity of the E-mailer led to losses at Amstrad's Amserve company. In 2001, Watkins resigned after being with Amstrad for over 25 years due to losses from the E-mailer.

Discontinuation
The Amstrad E-mailer relied heavily on the Amserve Service to function, without it, it deactivates.

All Amstrad E-mailer models have now been discontinued. On 30 April 2010 the Amserve E-mailer service was transferred to BSkyB, who announced that the Amserve e-mail service would close from 30 June 2011. From this date all support for the E-mailer services ended, although FAQs are available on Amstrad's website but the manuals are no longer available. 
The E-mailer phone will only function as a conventional phone with no online and e-mail after receiving a configuration change to stop it from deactivating, Once deactivated it stops functioning and can never be reactivated.
By 2011 there were still about 150,000 customers still using the Amstrad E-mailer.

Accessories
The Mailboard that slides out from under the handset was similar to the original ZX Spectrum keyboard, so it was similar to playing them on the Spectrum. The E3 Videophone Mailboard was the only one that was different, with rubber keys like the original ZX Spectrum.

All 3 models of the Mailboard can be used on all 3 E-mailer models, so they can use an E1 Mailboard on the E3 and vice versa, they work as a PS/2 keyboard.

The Amstrad E3 Superphone came with a gamepad similar to a PlayStation 1 controller.

Advertising on The E-mailer
The emailer also included advertising on its screen but when it downloaded the adverts it was on a free 0808 number so the customer was not charged.
Advertisers included Sky, AOL, BT, Orange, Toyota, Halifax, Dialaphone, HSBC and NS&I.

References

External links
 Amstrad's E-m@iler product page
 Amserve email web interface
 Amstrad Emailer Info Site

Amstrad
Personal digital assistants